Principal point may refer to:

Principal point (optics), in optics
Pinhole camera principal point, in the analysis of pinhole cameras
Principal Point, the southeast end of Wiencke Island